Blaze is a free-to-air television channel owned by A&E Networks UK, a joint venture between A&E Networks and Sky Group. This channel allows UK A&E to use its programming for the complete "lifecycle". 

A+E Networks Italy launched its Blaze on Sky Italy on March 22, 2017. In Spain and Portugal, a version of Blaze channel was launched by AMC Networks International in joint-venture with A&E Networks to replace the A&E channel on 18 April 2018, but closed and replaced with AMC Break on 19 April 2022.

Format and programming
The channels' programming is a best of A&E shows Blaze was the first channel launched in the UK by A&E Networks that did not borrow its name from one of the company's U.S. channels. The abbreviation "A&E" is commonly used to mean "Accident and Emergency unit" in the UK, so the company decided not to use that brand for the channel.

Having original only aired imported and rerun programming, Blaze commissioned its first original programme, Flipping Bangers, in 2017. It premiered on 6 April 2018 as a part of the Car Night programming block. A second season was later commissioned.

Staff
Elena Anniballi was appointed director of Blaze in April 2017. In February 2019, A&E Networks appointed Dan Korn as head of Blaze.

Programs 
Initial programs

Pawn Stars (2016–)
Mountain Men (2016–)
American Restoration (2016–)

Exclusive A&E programming (April 2019—)

Pawn Stars
Storage Wars
Counting Cars

Original programming:

Flipping Bangers(6 April 2018—) Just Might TV, Car Night programming block, two seasons
Spiky Goldhunters Pango Productions
Outback Truckers (seventh season—) Prospero Productions

References

A&E Networks
Television channels in the United Kingdom
Television channels and stations established in 2016